Synovitis is the medical term for inflammation of the synovial membrane. This membrane lines joints that possess cavities, known as synovial joints. The condition is usually painful, particularly when the joint is moved. The joint usually swells due to synovial fluid collection.

Synovitis may occur in association with arthritis as well as lupus, gout, and other conditions. Synovitis is more commonly found in rheumatoid arthritis than in other forms of arthritis, and can thus serve as a distinguishing factor, although it is also present in many joints affected with osteoarthritis. In rheumatoid arthritis, the fibroblast-like synoviocytes, highly specialized mesenchymal cells found in the synovial membrane, play an active and prominent role in the synovitis. Long term occurrence of synovitis can result in degeneration of the joint.

Signs and symptoms
Synovitis causes joint tenderness or pain, swelling and hard lumps, called nodules. When associated with rheumatoid arthritis, swelling is a better indicator than tenderness. The joints in your hands and fingers feel painful when pressed and when moving or gripping anything.

Diagnosis
A rheumatologist will aim to diagnose the cause of the patient’s pain by first determining whether it is inside the joint itself, meaning true synovitis, or if it is actually caused by an inflammation of the tendons, referred to as tendonitis. Imaging, such as an MRI or musculoskeletal ultrasound is often required to make a firm diagnosis.

Treatment
Synovitis symptoms can be treated with anti-inflammatory drugs such as NSAIDs. An injection of steroids may be done, directly into the affected joint. Specific treatment depends on the underlying cause of the synovitis.

See also
Tenosynovitis
Transient synovitis
 Knee effusion (water on the knee)

References

External links 

Inflammations
Disorders of synovium and tendon